Naumburg (Saale) Ost station is a railway station in the eastern part in the town of Naumburg, located in the Burgenlandkreis district in Saxony-Anhalt, Germany.

References

Railway stations in Saxony-Anhalt
Buildings and structures in Burgenlandkreis